This is a list of books in the Beechwood Bunny Tales series of children's books. With the exception of the two most recent titles, by Amélie Sarn, most of the books were written by Geneviève Huriet. Loïc Jouannigot has served as the stories' illustrator since its 1987 debut.

In France, the books are published by Éditions Milan. English versions of the first seven titles were issued by Gareth Stevens in 1991 and 1992.

Original French series

English titles

Gareth Stevens also published these books in a complete seven-volume set.''

References

Lists of children's books
Series of children's books